Manulea kansuensis  is a moth of the family Erebidae. It is found from Russia (Transbaikalia), through Mongolia to Gansu, China.

References

Moths described in 1936
Lithosiina